Perixera obrinaria is a moth of the family Geometridae.

References

Moths of Asia
Moths described in 1858